The Spies (German: Die Spione) is a 1919 German crime film directed by Ewald André Dupont and starring Max Landa, Johanna Terwin and Hanni Weisse.

The film's sets were designed by the art director Robert A. Dietrich.

Cast
 Max Landa as Detektiv
 Johanna Terwin as Marion 
 Emil Rameau as Dr. Mahon 
 Bernhard Goetzke as Jean Babtiste, politische Agenten
 Arthur Beder as Jean Babtiste 
 Paul Biensfeldt as Dunkle Existenz 
 Hanni Weisse

References

Bibliography
 Hans-Michael Bock and Tim Bergfelder. The Concise Cinegraph: An Encyclopedia of German Cinema. Berghahn Books, 2009.

External links

1919 films
Films of the Weimar Republic
German silent feature films
Films directed by E. A. Dupont
German crime films
1919 crime films
German black-and-white films
1910s German films
1910s German-language films